Taiwo Hassan  (born 31 October 1959), also known as Ogogo, is a Nigerian film actor, producer and director.

Early
Taiwo Hassan was born on 31 October 1959 in Ilaro, a town in Ogun State, Nigeria. He has a twin brother, and his family has a history of twins. His father and grandfather were both twins.

Education
Ogogo completed primary education at Christ Church School in Ilaro. He attended Gazikia college in Lagos for his secondary education but was unable to finish it due to a financial problem.  He then studied at a technical college and worked as an automobile mechanic at the water corporation for about 13 years.

Career 
Ogogo began his acting career in 1981, shortly after starting work as a mechanic. In 1994 he left his job at the water corporation to concentrate on acting.

Actor 
Aníkúlápó (2022)

References

External links

1959 births
Living people
20th-century Nigerian actors
21st-century Nigerian actors
Actors from Ogun State
Male actors from Ogun State
Male actors in Yoruba cinema
Nigerian film directors
Nigerian film producers
Nigerian male film actors
Yoruba male actors